Newsroom Afrika is a South African 24-hour digital satellite television news channel broadcast across Africa on DStv. It is one of two channels on the platform that is 100℅ black-owned, and 50℅ female-owned. The channel comes after MultiChoice ended their contract with the now defunct and controversial Afro Worldview. The channel has a number of top journalists who have long been in the industry, the likes of Cathy Mohlahlana, Stephen Grootes, and Sbu Ngalwa.

The "Z" in Newzroom has a significant meaning, it serves as a reminder of the news organization's desire to reach and stay at the Zenith of what they do. The letter "Z" is also a symbolic letter for South Africa and its citizens. Known as Zuid - Afrika, Azania and Mzansi. It represents the international code for South Africa, ZA.

History
In August 2018, MultiChoice terminated their contract with Mzwanele Manyi's controversial Afro Worldview. MultiChoice announced that it would be looking for new bidders. Out of a total of 111 competitors, Newzroom Afrika was selected. According to M-Net CEO Yolisa Phahle, Newzroom Afrika had "met all the qualifying criteria." Newzroom Afrika is owned by media expert, Thokozani Nkosi (50%), and former news anchor, Thabile Ngwato (50%). The channel took to the airwaves on 2 May, ahead of the 2019 National and Provincial Elections, and boasts of familiar radio and TV personalities. The channel competes with the public broadcaster's SABC News and eMedia Investments' news station eNCA.

References

External links
 https://themediaonline.co.za/2019/06/behind-the-scenes-at-newzroom-afrika-the-tv-channel-for-the-woke-nation/
 https://themediaonline.co.za/2019/07/inside-newzroom-afrika-the-talent-programming-and-advertising-opportunities/

Television news in Africa
24-hour television news channels
Television channels and stations established in 2019